Eranina dispar is a species of beetle in the family Cerambycidae. It was described by Bates in 1881. It is known from Panama and Mexico.

References

Eranina
Beetles described in 1881